Central Park West is a jazz standard by American saxophonist John Coltrane. It first appeared on his 1964 studio album Coltrane's Sound.

Background 

Central Park West was included in Coltrane's Sound, a studio album recorded at Atlantic Studios during the sessions for My Favorite Things. The album was assembled after Coltrane had stopped recording for the label and was under contract to Impulse! Records. Like Prestige and Blue Note Records before them, as Coltrane's fame grew during the 1960s, Atlantic used unissued recordings and released them without either Coltrane's input or approval.

Composition 
The song is a 10-bar form in B major that is played like a ballad.

Central Park West employs Coltrane changes. In the song, Coltrane divides the octave into four, producing an ascending cycle of minor thirds: B – D – F – Ab – B. He slightly alters the cycle’s order, so that it becomes B – D – Ab – F – B, which alternates the modulation between minor thirds and tritones.

Notable recordings 
 Pharoah Sanders in "Rejoice (1981)"
 Tommy Flanagan and J.R. Monterose in "...And a Little Pleasure (1989)"
 Joe Lovano in "From The Soul (1992)"
 Jimmy Bruno in "Burnin' (1994)'"
 Everette Harp in "First Love (2009)"
 Avishai Cohen in "Duende (2013)" 
 Glenn Zaleski in "Fellowship (2017)"
 José James in "The Dreamer (10th Anniversary Edition) (2018)"
 Tommy Flanagan in "Giant Steps (2018)"
 Lakecia Benjamin and Jazzmeia Horn in "Pursuance : The Coltranes (2020)"

See also 

 Coltrane changes

Notes

References 

Jazz standards
John Coltrane
1960s jazz standards
Jazz compositions
Jazz compositions in B major
Jazz ballads
Sentimental ballads
Compositions by John Coltrane